Henry Lee Shattuck (October 12, 1879February 2, 1971) was an American attorney, philanthropist, and politician from Massachusetts.

Biography
Shattuck was born in Brookline, Massachusetts, and graduated from Noble and Greenough School in 1897. He then went onto Harvard, from which he graduated with his bachelor's degree in 1901 and his law degree in 1904. He then worked for the law firm Ropes, Gray & Gorham, which made him partner in 1909. He was a member of the Massachusetts House of Representatives from 1920 to 1930 and 1943 to 1949 and represented Ward 5 on the Boston City Council from 1933 to 1941. Politically influential, his endorsement "was a pivotal factor in a number of mayoral elections".

In 1929, Shattuck was appointed to the position of Treasurer of Harvard University, just prior to the onset of the Great Depression. In 1937 he became a senior fellow and served as Harvard's acting president when James B. Conant was out of the country. Other positions included chair of the Boston Municipal Research Bureau and, for 33 years, president of the private North Bennet Street Industrial School.

A supporter of Irish causes despite having a limited Irish ancestry, he served as the Treasurer of the Charitable Irish Society of Boston. He also received honorary degree from the National University of Ireland (1950) and Trinity College, Dublin (1955). He also received honorary degrees from Williams College, Boston College, and his alma mater, Harvard University.

He was a member of the Massachusetts Historical Society (MHS) from 1935 until his death. His personal papers, totaling 84 boxes, are kept at MHS.

See also
 Massachusetts legislature: 1920, 1921–1922, 1923–1924, 1925–1926, 1927–1928, 1929–1930, 1943–1944, 1945–1946, 1947–1948

References

1879 births
1971 deaths
Politicians from Brookline, Massachusetts
Noble and Greenough School alumni
Harvard Law School alumni
Massachusetts lawyers
Boston City Council members
Republican Party members of the Massachusetts House of Representatives
People associated with Ropes & Gray
Harvard College alumni